Mod Ka Nimbahera is a village in Bhilwara district, Rajasthan, India.

References

Villages in Bhilwara district